The Rutka (Rÿde) is a river in Kirov Oblast and Mari El, Russia. The Rutka rises in Kirov Oblast, passes the Mari Depression and flows to the Cheboksary Reservoir. The Rutka freezes up in November and stays under ice until April. The river is navigable.

References 

Rivers of Mari El